for others with the same name see Rhind

John Stevenson Rhind (1859 – 1937) was a Scottish sculptor based in Edinburgh.

Life

Less is known of John Stevenson than of his family counterparts in Edinburgh but he was a nephew of John Rhind and cousin of William Birnie Rhind and J. Massey Rhind, all sculptors in Edinburgh. He would appear to  also connect to the  family of David Watson Stevenson and apparently links between these two prominent Scottish sculpting families.

He is known to have attended the Royal Scottish Academy Life School 1881–7. In 1886, he won the RSA prize for modelling. He exhibited in the Royal Scottish Academy from 1877 to 1920.

His sculpture is however well-represented across the city.

From 1901 until death he lived and worked from Belford Road in Edinburgh, working from the Dean Studios.

He is buried in Dalry Cemetery in the south-west of Edinburgh with his wife, Janet Scott Brunton (1860-1919). The grave lies against the north wall, west of the Dalry Road entrance.

Principal Public Works

Small bronze figure of Tubal-cain on top of Sir James Gowans’ Brass Founders' Pillar in Nicolson Square (1886)
Bust of Sir James Young Simpson (1889) held by the National Gallery of Scotland
Obelisk to Sir James Steel, Lord Provost of Edinburgh, Dean Cemetery (1906)
Statue to Queen Victoria at the Foot of Leith Walk (1907)
Statue of Edward VII in Victoria Park (1913)

Other Known Works

Memorial to Thomas Stuart Burnett, Dean Cemetery (1889)
Memorial to Dr Balfour in Portobello Cemetery (1907)
Bust of Provost Mackie, Thomas Morton Hall, Leith

References

Scottish sculptors
Scottish male sculptors
1859 births
1937 deaths
People associated with Edinburgh
20th-century British sculptors
19th-century British sculptors